Militari Shopping is a retail park situated in the Militari district of Bucharest, Romania. Located on Iuliu Maniu Boulevard, it has  of floor space.

Beside the Auchan hypermarket and Praktiker DIY store, the shopping center hosts another 61 shops. For kids, Militari Shopping hosts shops such as Imaginarium, Toyplex, Okaidi and Sergent Major that sell toys, clothing, accessories and educational material.

Notes

External links
The Official Website of Militari Shopping

Shopping malls in Bucharest